The Falcon is a Grade II listed public house at 2 St John's Hill, Battersea, London.

The current Falcon inn was built in the late 19th century as a purpose-built hotel, with a pub on the ground floor, and is on the Campaign for Real Ale's National Inventory of Historic Pub Interiors. It has entered the  Guinness World Records for having the longest bar counter in a public house.

The history of The Falcon can be traced back to 1733 and it is likely that an inn stood at the site before that time.

History
The Manor of Battersea was owned from about 1613 to 1763 by the St John baronets, of Lydiard Tregoze, who latterly became the Bolingbroke Viscounts. The supporters of the armorial bearings of the St John family were a falcon wings displayed Or, or, more plainly, a pair of golden falcons displaying their wings. The Falcon inn is thought to have taken its name from this display of heraldry.

The Survey of London points to the earliest record of The Falcon dating to 1733, but speculates that an inn of that name had by that time long existed. An 1882 publication about Battersea makes the claim that a portion of the Falcon Tavern dates back 275 years. The Falcon site was, from 1717, on the Southwark to Kingston turnpike, at a ford over the Hydeburn brook (itself later renamed the Falcon brook) and at the foot of St Johns Hill and Lavender Hill. Its idyllic position is captured in a circa 1801 caricature by John Nixon, bearing comic verse from 1785 by Edward Trapp Pilgrim; both playing on the name of the then landlord, Robert Death.

The inn was extended some time after 1835 and refronted in brick by the then landlord John Alder. In the 1870s and 1880s the area around The Falcon was developed into the terraced-house streetscape which remains to current times. Alfred Heaver, one of the key property developers, with the assistance of the Wandsworth District Board of Works, established St Johns Road as a straight wide road from what had been little more than a farm-track. The Falcon now found itself occupying a key location at the crossroads of St Johns Road and St Johns Hill as both were developed into streets of shops. The then landlord, John Tavener, entered into what appears to have been a land-for-reconstruction swap with another developer, George Nathaniel Street, so that The Falcon was in 1882-3 relocated to the curved crossroads corner of its site and rebuilt in its current form by builders R. & H. Pickersgill.

J.F.B., writing in the 1 December 1883 edition of Notes and Queries, mourned the passing of the old Falcon Inn, and of quaint old inns not only in London and the suburbs, but in the country:

"Its appearance was very picturesque, standing in the hollow at the corner of St John's HIll and Falcon Road. Being the last stage into London on the high road from Portsmouth, many travellers must know it. The old wych-elm, with a cupboard made of its hollow trunk, and a door hanging on old fashioned rusty hinges, was a striking feature; but the landlord would not 'spare that tree' and it has been grubbed up by the roots. The builder has choked up the well and poured concrete on the sward  ... a modern gin-palace will take the place of a low-pitched old tavern with a cross-beamed taproom and a quaint doorway before which a maypole might have been reared..."

Reopened as The Falcon Hotel, the building is described by the Survey of London as a "robust piece of London pub architecture in the Franco-Italianate taste", in brick with cement dressings, and having an ornamental turret above the corner gable. The interior of the pub was remodelled in 1896 by the builders Turtle & Appleton, who created an open-plan space by the use of cast-iron columns to support the upper floor, and the introduction of elaborate oak-work and glass-panel illustrations of the ancient inn's life. A billiard room was added to the rear of the Hotel in 1901 by Tavener's widow. Tavener's venture appears to have been a great success, in large part thanks to its location; in 1911 the hotel was employing about 20 people. In 1921, Tavener's son, also John, sold the business for £70,000 to the Wenlock Brewery.

References

Pubs in the London Borough of Wandsworth
Grade II listed pubs in London
National Inventory Pubs
Buildings and structures in Battersea
19th-century architecture in the United Kingdom
Buildings and structures completed in the 19th century
Grade II listed buildings in the London Borough of Wandsworth